Klepper is a surname of German origin, which derives from the Middle High German word kleppern, meaning "to gossip". Alternative spellings include Klepfer, Kloepfer, and Klopfer. The name may refer to:

Christian Kloepfer (1847–1913), Canadian politician
Ed Klepfer (1888–1950), American baseball player
Frank B. Klepper (1864-1933), American  politician
Jeff Klepper (born 1953), American musician
Jochen Klepper (1903–1942), German writer
John Klepper (1906–1997), American politician
Jordan Klepper (born 1979), American comedian
Leon Klepper (1990-1991), Romanian composer

See also
7130 Klepper, a main-belt asteroid
Klepper canoe
Klepper (TV series)

German-language surnames